The Serena Williams 1999 season was her breakthrough season, winning her first career title at the Open Gaz de France and winning her first slam at the US Open.

All matches

Singles matches

Doubles matches

Mixed Doubles matches

Tournament schedule

Singles schedule
Williams' 1999 singles tournament schedule is as follows:

Doubles schedule
Williams' 1999 doubles tournament schedule is as follows:

Mixed Doubles schedule

Williams' 1999 doubles tournament schedule is as follows:

Yearly records

Head-to-head matchups

  Lindsay Davenport 3–0
  Julie Halard-Decugis 2–0
  Magüi Serna 2–0
  Monica Seles 2–0
  Inés Gorrochategui 1-0
  Raluca Sandu 1–0
  Åsa Svensson 1–0
  Nathalie Tauziat 1–0
  Lisa Raymond 1-0
  Kimberly Po 1–0
  Jelena Kostanić 1–0
  Laurence Courtois 1–0
  Nathalie Dechy 1–0
  Amelie Mauresmo 1–0
  Jessica Steck 1–0
  Cara Black 1–0
  Mary Pierce 1–0
  Alicia Molik 1–0
  Amanda Coetzer 1–0
  Jennifer Capriati 1–0
  Kim Clijsters 1–0
  Conchita Martínez 1–0
  Rita Grande 1–0
  Mariana Díaz Oliva 1–0
  Tatiana Panova 1–0
  Irina Spîrlea 1–0
  Elena Likhovtseva 1–0
  Patty Schnyder 1–0
  Venus Williams 1–1
  Steffi Graf 1-1
  Martina Hingis 3–1
  Arantxa Sánchez Vicario 2–1
  Sandrine Testud 1–2
  Mary Joe Fernández 0–1

Finals

Singles: 6 (5–1)

Doubles: 4 (3–1)

Mixed doubles: (0-1)

Earnings

 Figures in United States dollars (USD) unless noted.

See also

 1999 WTA Tour

References

External links

Serena Williams tennis seasons
Williams, Serena
1999 in American tennis